Beleh Keh Rural District is a rural district (dehestan) in Alut District, Baneh County, Kurdistan Province, Iran. At the 2006 census, its population was 2,691, in 516 families. The rural district has 10 villages.

References 

Rural Districts of Kurdistan Province
Baneh County